Eldon Leonard Stroburg (born November 4, 1927) was an American politician in the state of Iowa.

Stroburg was born in Blockton, Iowa. He attended Northwest Missouri State University and is a farmer. He served in the Iowa House of Representatives from 1969 to 1971 as a Democrat.

References

1927 births
Possibly living people
People from Taylor County, Iowa
Northwest Missouri State University alumni
Farmers from Iowa
Democratic Party members of the Iowa House of Representatives